Thaba Phatswa is a town in Thabo Mofutsanyane District Municipality in the Free State province of South Africa.

Town some 30 km south-east of Thaba Nchu and 22 km north of Hobhouse. It takes its name from the mountain a few kilometres to the south-west. Said to be of Tswana origin and to mean ‘black with white spots’.

References

Populated places in the Mantsopa Local Municipality